Villa Minozzo is a comune (municipality) in the Province of Reggio Emilia in the Italian region Emilia-Romagna, located about  west of Bologna and about  southwest of Reggio Emilia.

Geography
Through the frazione of Civago and the Forbici Pass, elevation , the Garfagana can be reached.

See also
Morsiano

References

External links

 Official website

Cities and towns in Emilia-Romagna